Chiapas Fútbol Club, commonly known as Jaguares de Chiapas, was a football club based in Tuxtla Gutiérrez, Mexico, that played in the Mexican football league system Liga MX. The team played their home matches at the Estadio Víctor Manuel Reyna.

History

Jaguares de Chiapas
The club in its Chiapas reincarnation was "founded" on 27 June 2002. They played their first game on 3 August against Tigres de la UANL, losing 3–1, with Lucio Filomeno scoring the club's first ever goal. The club's first win came on 25 August, a 1–0 win over San Luis. They finished the Apertura 2002, with a record of three wins, seven draws, and nine defeats. In the Clausura 2005 they finished with six wins, four draws, and seven defeats, and the head coach José Luis Trejo was sacked in the middle of the season. The club then named Antonio Mohamed as manager, but poor results meant another change with Fernando Quirarte taking over for the remainder of the season, bringing stability to the team and results improved. They won the Chiapas Cup in 2004 and on 16 July 2005, they won the Chiapas Cup for a second time, by defeating Necaxa at the Victor Manuel Reyna Stadium. In February 2008 Sergio Almaguer was named manager of Chiapas.

In the Clausura 2006, under new coach Eduardo de la Torre, the club finished with the second best record over the regular season, and with it a place in the Play-offs, where they lost in the Quarter-finals to Guadalajara.

On May 20, 2013, the club was sold to Grupo Delfines whose majority stake holder Amado Yañez is also owner of Querétaro FC  Stating low attendance and lack of sponsorship, the new owner announced he would be moving the team to Querétaro to replace Querétaro FC recently relegated to the second division. The owner added the fans of Querétaro deserved a top division club in their city.

Chiapas F.C.
On May 20, 2013, it was announced Chiapas Liga MX team Jaguares de Chiapas was sold and relocated to Querétaro, Mexico. On May 28, 2013, it was announced the team San Luis was relocating to the city of Tuxtla Gutiérrez and was renamed Chiapas Fútbol Club, thus bringing back a first division team back to Chiapas. The new Chiapas franchise took over the San Luis television contract with Televisa. At the conclusion of the Clausura 2017 tournament, Chiapas were relegated to Ascenso MX after finishing last in the relegation table.

On June 8, 2017, the team dissolved after the owner of Chiapas Carlos Lopez Chargoy met with their coaching staff and players. But a week later, the president of Liga MX announced that the team is disaffiliated and made bail to pay what is due. The next day, a soccer team would return to Chiapas, but it would have to play in Liga Premier de Mexico. Jiquipilas Valle Verde F.C. announced on June 23 that it would change its franchise from Jiquipilas to Tuxtla Gutiérrez, naming the team 'Chiapas Jaguar' and playing their home games at VMR, but four days later this did not happen because the FMF prohibited it to use the name, which the family Lopez Chargoy owns.

Honours
  Chiapas Cup: (3)
2003, 2005, 2007
  Copa Mesoamericana: (1)
2011

Record players

Managers

Jaguares de Chiapas

 Salvador Capitano Valenti (July 1, 2002–Oct 13, 2002)
 Sergio Bueno (March 13, 2003 – June 30, 2003)
 José Luis Trejo (July 1, 2003–Feb 14, 2005)
 Antonio Ascencio Meza (Feb 14, 2004–June 30, 2004)
 Antonio Mohamed (Feb 16, 2005–April 3, 2005)
 Fernando Quirarte (April 7, 2005–Sept 13, 2005)
 Luis Tena (Sept 15, 2005–June 30, 2006)
 Eduardo de la Torre (July 1, 2006–Feb 15, 2007)
 Víctor Manuel Vucetich (Feb 15, 2007–Sept 7, 2007)
 Isidoro García (Sept 8, 2007–Feb 17, 2008)
 Sergio Almaguer (Feb 20, 2008–Sept 21, 2008)
 Francisco Avilán Cruz (Sept 30, 2008–Dec 31, 2008)
 Miguel Brindisi (Jan 1, 2009–May 4, 2009)
 Luis Tena (May 5, 2009–Feb 8, 2010)
 Juan Manuel Álvarez (interim) (Feb 11, 2010–Feb 18, 2010)
 Pablo Marini (Feb 16, 2010–June 30, 2010)
 José Guadalupe Cruz (July 1, 2010 – June 30, 2013)

Chiapas F.C.
 Sergio Bueno (July 1, 2013 – May 18, 2015)
 Ricardo Lavolpe (May 25, 2015 – 2016)

Shirt sponsors and manufacturers

See also
Cultural significance of the jaguar in North America
Football in Mexico
Tuxtla F.C.

References

External links
 Official site

 
Football clubs in Chiapas
Liga MX teams
Association football clubs established in 2002
2002 establishments in Mexico
Association football clubs disestablished in 2017